Down to You is a 2000 American romantic comedy film written and directed by Kris Isacsson, starring Freddie Prinze Jr. and Julia Stiles as young lovers who meet in college and go through the ups and downs of a relationship. Selma Blair, Shawn Hatosy, Zak Orth, Ashton Kutcher, Rosario Dawson, Lucie Arnaz, and Henry Winkler play supporting roles. Isacsson's first and only feature film, Down to You paired Prinze and Stiles a year after their respective starring roles in the successful high school-set romantic comedies She's All That and 10 Things I Hate About You. Despite being the second-highest grossing film at the domestic box office its opening weekend, the film received poor response from critics and failed to recoup its $35 million budget.

Plot 
While attending college in New York City, sophomore Al and freshman Imogen begin dating. After three months they have fallen in love. Imogen, an aspiring artist, arranges a private showing at an art gallery for Al's birthday, after which the two have sex for the first time.

Al's roommate Monk, who has become a pornographic film actor and director, tells him that love is illusory and fleeting, and Monk's co-star Cyrus flirts with Al. Al loses a bet and must perform as an extra in one of Monk's films. This causes an argument between him and Imogen, who wants to spend time with him before she goes to France for the summer. He abandons the film in favor of spending the night with her.

While in France, Imogen is asked by her cousin if she and Al will marry. This unnerves her as she is only nineteen, and she acts differently toward Al on her return. His father, who hosts a cooking show, wants to do a father-and-son show after Al graduates, but Al would rather pursue his dream of becoming a chef of French cuisine.

Concerned that he and Imogen are drifting apart, Al arranges a picnic in the countryside; on the way back, she drives drunk and crashes into a tree. Seeing the accident as a sign, they try to improve their relationship. Though they seem happy, Monk predicts it is a precursor to a breakup.

When Imogen declines to have sex one night, Al feels emasculated and has a sexual fantasy about Cyrus. Imogen fears that she may be pregnant, and though she turns out not to be, this further strains their relationship. At one of Monk's parties, Cyrus tries to seduce Al, but he declines.

Meanwhile, Imogen spends time with musician acquaintance Jim; when Al learns she has agreed to design Jim's album cover, they argue and she leaves upset. The next day, she confesses she had sex with Jim afterward. After a tearful breakup, she moves to San Francisco to finish school.

Al graduates but becomes depressed. Monk is too preoccupied with his new work as an author and lecturer to comfort him, and their friendship dissolves. After a period of isolation, Al starts dating again and has a casual relationship with Cyrus, but she eventually moves away. He enrolls in the French Culinary Institute but feels unmotivated and drops out, and is reduced to bar-hopping with his single friend Eddie. Drunk and missing Imogen, he tries to purge himself of his feelings for her by drinking a bottle of her shampoo, resulting in his hospitalization.

Al's parents throw a party with his friends to lift his spirits. Monk apologizes to Al, and they mend their friendship. Imogen appears, and they spend time catching up; she has become a cover artist for a San Francisco-based book publisher. She confesses that she misses him, and gives him a book titled Down to You with her cover artwork depicting the two of them in love. They rekindle their romance, deciding that they met too young but can start over. Al takes a job at a four-star restaurant in San Francisco and surprises Imogen with a romantic evening.

Cast 
 Freddie Prinze Jr. as Alfred "Al" Connelly
 Julia Stiles as Imogen
 Selma Blair as Cyrus, an MIT dropout turned pornographic film actress
 Shawn Hatosy as Eddie Hicks, one of Al's roommates
 Zak Orth as Monk Jablonski, Al's other roommate
 Ashton Kutcher as Jim Morrison, a musician who dresses and acts like his namesake, Jim Morrison of the Doors
 Rosario Dawson as Lana, Imogen's friend and later roommate
 Lucie Arnaz as Judy Connelly, Al's mother
 Henry Winkler as "Chef Ray" Connelly, Al's father
Adam Carolla and Jimmy Kimmel appear as themselves in a sequence in which Al imagines himself being made fun of on The Man Show. Additional minor roles are played by Zay Harding and Lauren German as a lovestruck couple, Chloe Hunter as one of Al's high school girlfriends, Bradley Pierce as one of Imogen's high school boyfriends, Lola Glaudini as a woman Al goes on a date with, Alexia Landeau as Imogen's cousin, Susan Blommaert as a psychiatrist, Frank Wood as a doctor, Joanna P. Adler as a woman who gives Eddie a nipple piercing, and Mark Blum as a television host interviewing Monk.

Reception 
Down to You opened at number 2 at the US box office and made $7.6 million in its opening weekend, behind Next Friday. It went on to gross $24.4 million worldwide, below its $35 million budget. The film received negative reviews from critics. Owen Gleiberman of Entertainment Weekly gave it an "F" grade, calling the dialogue "embarrassing in its coy and wistful hungry-heart neuroticism" while criticizing the lead actors' performances and Isacsson's writing: "Making his first feature, writer-director Kris Isacsson treats the most squishy-sincere rituals of first love with a quivering sense of discovery. Obviously, it's a discovery to him. For the audience, it's like watching the dreckiest of teen puppy courtships trying to pass itself off as Annie Hall." In The New York Times, A. O. Scott described it as "scrubbed, wholesome and bland", opining that Isacsson "seems aware that a feature film requires narrative complication: not even really good-looking people can be happy all the time. But he flees from anything that might involve real human emotion, or for that matter any credible human activity other than looking good." Brendan Kelly of Variety wrote that "Prinze and Stiles have genuine screen charisma to spare, and there's something oddly appealing about this mushy romantic tale, but first-time feature writer-director Kris Isacsson doesn't have the skills to raise it far above its formulaic foundation."

Metacritic, which uses a weighted average, assigned the film a score of 13 out of 100 based on 21 critics, indicating "overwhelming dislike".

Soundtrack 

A soundtrack album was released simultaneously with the film, featuring twelve songs from the soundtrack. William Ruhlmann of AllMusic gave it two stars out of five in an unfavorable review, describing some songs and artists as similar-sounding imitations of more well-known ones from other recent romantic comedy soundtracks. He singled out Belle Perez as "the poster child for all this weightless pop/rock, following up her earnest greeting with 'This is me/Life should be/Fun for everyone.' Indeed, it should, and if you're in your late teens, maybe it is. But much of the Down to You soundtrack tries to be ingenuous and only manages to be callow." He singled out the closing track, Sam Phillips' "I Need Love", as a highlight, but opined that it made the rest of the album seem even less impressive in comparison.

Track listing

Additional songs used in the film but not included on the soundtrack album include:

References

External links 
 
 
 
 

2000 films
2000 romantic comedy films
American romantic comedy films
Miramax films
2000 directorial debut films
2000s English-language films
2000s American films